Scopula junctaria, the simple wave, is a moth of the family Geometridae. The species was first described by Francis Walker in 1861. It is found in the whole of Canada and the northern United States, south to Maryland, Arizona, and California.

Adults are on wing from late May to August. There is one generation per year.

The larvae feed on various plants, including chickweed, clover and elm.

Subspecies
Scopula junctaria junctaria
Scopula junctaria quinquelinearia (Packard, 1871)
Scopula junctaria johnstonaria McDunnough, 1941

References

External links

Moths described in 1861
Moths of North America
junctaria
Taxa named by Francis Walker (entomologist)